Patricia is a feminine given name.

Patricia may also refer to:

Places 
 Patricia, Alberta, Canada, a hamlet
 Patricia Lake (Alberta), in Jasper National Park
 Patricia Bay, British Columbia, Canada
 Patricia, South Dakota, United States, an unincorporated community
 Patricia, Texas, United States, an unincorporated community
 436 Patricia, an asteroid

Boats and ships 
 , a United States troop ship
 , a cargo ship
 Patricia (log canoe)
 THV Patricia, a vessel operated by Trinity House

Songs 
 "Patricia" (1950 song), recorded by Perry Como
 "Patricia" (Perez Prado song)
 "Patricia", a song on High as Hope, a 2018 Florence and the Machine album
 "Patricia", a song written by Art Pepper dedicated to his daughter of the same name.

People 
 Matt Patricia (born 1974), American National Football League head coach
 Patricia (actress), Burmese actress and model born Win Thinzar Thaw in 1997

Other uses 
 List of storms named Patricia
 Patricia (butterfly), a genus of clearwing butterflies
 Patricia tree, a computer science data structure
 Patricia (film), a 1942 French comedy film

See also
 , a cruise ship launched in 1949
 , a cargo ship, later converted to a tanker, launched in 1962
 , originally commissioned as HMAV Lady Patricia